Zdeněk Bakala (born 7 February 1961) is a Czech entrepreneur and investor. He is a stakeholder in mining, energy, financial businesses and owns the media company Economia, the publisher of Hospodářské noviny and Respekt magazine among others. As of 2017, Bakala is the tenth wealthiest person in the Czech Republic according to Forbes. His philanthropic activities are directed via the Bakala Foundation.

In September 2018, Bakala found a lawsuit in federal court in Beaufort, South Carolina in which he claims that a controversional Slovak businessman Pavol Krúpa has initiated frivolous lawsuits, promoted death threats on Facebook and instigated criminal investigations targeting him. The lawsuit also says that Krupa threatened to send soccer hooligans to protest in front of Bakala's home in Switzerland and ultimately demanded a payment of 500 million Czech koruna (US$23 million) in 2017, as a compensation for losses suffered by buying Bakala's New World Resources stock, to stop. According to the complaint, when Bakala rejected that offer, Krupa hired Beverly Hills, California-based Crowds on Demand “to bring his campaign of defamation, extortion, and harassment to the U.S.”

See also 
List of Czechs by net worth

References 

Czech business executives
Czech billionaires
1961 births
Living people